Aaron Jones (born 19 October 1994) is an American cricketer who plays as batsman for the United States national cricket team. He also plays for Barbados and Combined Campuses and Colleges in West Indian domestic cricket. Jones was born in Queens, New York.

Biography
A right-handed top-order batsman and occasional leg spin bowler, he made his List A debut for the team in January 2016, playing against the Leeward Islands in the 2015–16 Regional Super50. He made his first-class debut for Barbados in the 2017–18 Regional Four Day Competition on 26 October 2017.

In October 2018, he was named in the United States' squad for the 2018 ICC World Cricket League Division Three tournament in Oman. He was the leading run-scorer for the United States in the tournament, with 200 runs in five matches.

In February 2019, he was named in the United States' Twenty20 International (T20I) squad for their series against the United Arab Emirates. The matches were the first T20I fixtures to be played by the United States cricket team. He made his T20I debut for the United States against the United Arab Emirates on 15 March 2019.

In April 2019, he was named in the United States cricket team's squad for the 2019 ICC World Cricket League Division Two tournament in Namibia. He was named as one of the six players to watch during the tournament. In the United States' second match of the tournament, against hosts Namibia, Jones scored his first century in List A cricket, making 103 not out. The United States finished in the top four places in the tournament, therefore gaining One Day International (ODI) status. Jones made his ODI debut for the United States on 27 April 2019, against Papua New Guinea, in the tournament's third-place playoff.

In June 2019, he was named in a 30-man training squad for the United States cricket team, ahead of the Regional Finals of the 2018–19 ICC T20 World Cup Americas Qualifier tournament in Bermuda. The following month, he was one of five players to sign a 12-month central contract with USA Cricket. In August 2019, he was named in the United States' squad for the Regional Finals of the 2018–19 ICC T20 World Cup Americas Qualifier tournament.

In November 2019, he was named in the United States' squad for the 2019–20 Regional Super50 tournament. He was added to the New Jersey Somerset Cavaliers for the 2021 Minor League Cricket season.

In June 2021, he was selected to take part in the Minor League Cricket tournament in the United States following the players' draft. In October 2021, he was named as the vice-captain of the American squad for the 2021 ICC Men's T20 World Cup Americas Qualifier tournament in Antigua.

In March 2023, he was signed by the Seattle Orcas as a part of their squad in the Major League Cricket Draft.

References

External links

1994 births
Living people
American cricketers
United States One Day International cricketers
United States Twenty20 International cricketers
Barbadian cricketers
Barbados cricketers
Combined Campuses and Colleges cricketers
Cricketers from New York City